Jewel Kʼawiil (fl. 849), was an ajaw of the Maya city of Tikal. He ruled c.849.

Notes

Footnotes

References
 

Rulers of Tikal
9th century in the Maya civilization
9th-century monarchs in North America
9th century in Guatemala